The Chery A3 is a compact car built by the Chinese manufacturer Chery between 2008-2015, offered as a 4-door sedan and as a 5-door hatchback with a 0.27cx. It was revealed for the first time  as a concept car at the 2006 Beijing Motor Show and production car two years later which went on sale in September 2008. The car was designed by the Italian studio Pininfarina.

In South America, Eastern Europe and Oceania it is marketed numerous different names, including: Chery M11 (in Ukraine and Russia), Chery Tengo (in Serbia and nearby countries), Chery Chance/Niche (in Turkey), Chery Cielo (in Brazil), Chery Skin/Skin Sport (in Chile), Chery Orinoco (in Venezuela), Chery Cruise (in Indonesia) and Chery J3 (in Australia and New Zealand).

Safety and equipment 
The car comes in standard with driver and front passenger airbags and additionally it can offer side airbags and as well front and rear curtain airbags. Also standard equipment includes ABS and EBD and optional there is TCS. The body structure is made 40% of high strength steel sheet. Standard equipment also includes power steering, electric windows, air conditioning, 205/55 R16 tyres with aluminium alloy rims, remote central locking or cd/mp3-player.

In December 2008, A3 received a five-star China-NCAP safety rating, becoming the first indigenous car to achieve such a high-test rating. The process consists in three different tests; 100% front crash test with a wall (like the U.S. National Highway Traffic Safety Administration (NHTSA) test), a 40% offset test (like the EuroNCAP) and a side crash test like the EuroNCAP.

The results of the A3 were 11,22 points in the 100% frontal crash test, 15.03 points in the 40% offset crash test and 16 points in the side crash test. Another Chinese car that received five stars in the testings was the Roewe 550.

Reception 
The Chery A3 is regarded as "a turning point for the Chinese automotive industry" for its understated yet original design, when at its release many Chinese cars used designs heavily borrowing from stablished foreign brands.

Europe 
Rumors were raised in December 2010 that the car was about to be built at the struggling FSO plant in Poland, when a Chery A3 was spotted coming out of the factory's gates in Warsaw and bearing a label marked with the FSO logo in the windscreen corner. However, Chery stated that it plans to export cars to the European Union only after 2015, though some of its products are already available in Italy through the DR Motor brand.

In March 2011, Belgrade Municipal police received a number of 15 Chery A3 vehicles (and two Tiggo), awarding the Chinese automaker as the winner in a bid where it reportedly competed against recognized brands from Europe. They are the first law-enforcement body in Europe to drive Chinese manufactured vehicles, after the Chery brand already gained access to the governmental vehicle market in countries like Egypt and Iraq.

Motorsport 
The Chery Flying Star Rally Team is racing Chery A3 cars in the Chinese Rally Championship in the last seasons and from 2011 it entered the Chinese Touring Car Championship too with the A3.

Engines

Gallery

References

External links
 
Chery A3 official website (hatchback)
Chery A3 Review and Test Drive at Illustration of Chinese Car
Detailed Photo Gallery of the Chery A3 at China Car Times
Chery A3 Crash test by C-NCAP (Video) on YouTube

A3
Compact cars
Sedans
Hatchbacks
C-NCAP small family cars
Pininfarina
Front-wheel-drive vehicles
Cars introduced in 2008
2010s cars